Ana Isabel Vermelhudo Cabecinha (born 29 April 1984) is a Portuguese race walker. She was born in Santiago Maior (Beja).

Achievements

References

1984 births
Living people
People from Beja, Portugal
Portuguese female racewalkers
Athletes (track and field) at the 2008 Summer Olympics
Athletes (track and field) at the 2012 Summer Olympics
Athletes (track and field) at the 2016 Summer Olympics
Athletes (track and field) at the 2020 Summer Olympics
Olympic athletes of Portugal
World Athletics Championships athletes for Portugal
Sportspeople from Beja District
20th-century Portuguese women
21st-century Portuguese women